1151 Ithaka, provisional designation , is a carbonaceous asteroid from the inner regions of the asteroid belt, approximately 14 kilometers in diameter. It was discovered by Karl Reinmuth at the Heidelberg-Königstuhl State Observatory in 1929, and later named for the Greek island of Ithaca.

Discovery 

Ithaka was discovered on 8 September 1929, by German astronomer Karl Reinmuth at the Heidelberg Observatory in southwest Germany. Five nights later, it was independently discovered by Soviet astronomer Grigory Neujmin at Simeiz Observatory on the Crimean peninsula. Only the first discoverer is acknowledged by the Minor Planet Center. The body's observation arc begins with its official discovery observation at Heidelberg.

Orbit and classification 

Ithaka is a non-family asteroid from the background population. It orbits the Sun in the inner main-belt at a distance of 1.7–3.1 AU once every 3 years and 9 months (1,364 days). Its orbit has an eccentricity of 0.28 and an inclination of 7° with respect to the ecliptic.

Physical characteristics 

Ithaka is an assumed carbonaceous C-type asteroid, untypical for inner-belt asteroids.

Rotation period 

In 2011, three rotational lightcurves of Ithaka were obtained from photometric observations. Lightcurve analysis gave a well-defined rotation period between 4.93115 and 4.932 hours with a brightness amplitude of 0.12 to 0.15 magnitude.

Diameter and albedo 

According to the survey carried out by the NEOWISE mission of NASA's Wide-field Infrared Survey Explorer, Ithaka measures between 8.97 and 20.46 kilometers in diameter and its surface has an albedo between 0.02 and 0.13. A collaboration of Italian and American photometrists estimate a diameter of  kilometers, and the Collaborative Asteroid Lightcurve Link assumes a standard albedo for carbonaceous asteroids of 0.057 and derives a diameter of 14.37 kilometers based on an absolute magnitude of 12.94.

Naming 

This minor planet was named after the Greek Ionian Island of Ithaca located in the Ionian Sea. In Greek mythology, the legendary hero Odysseus was the King of Ithaca (also see 1143 Odysseus). The official naming citation was mentioned in The Names of the Minor Planets by Paul Herget in 1955.

Notes

References

External links 
 Asteroid Lightcurve Database (LCDB), query form (info )
 Dictionary of Minor Planet Names, Google books
 Asteroids and comets rotation curves, CdR – Observatoire de Genève, Raoul Behrend
 Discovery Circumstances: Numbered Minor Planets (1)-(5000) – Minor Planet Center
 
 

001151
Discoveries by Karl Wilhelm Reinmuth
Named minor planets
19290908